Sheila Ruskin (born 28 March 1946) is an English actress.

She played Vipsania in the BBC adaptation of I, Claudius (1976), Kassia in the Doctor Who serial The Keeper of Traken (1981) and Alta One in the Blake's 7 episode "Redemption" (1979).

Her other TV credits include: MacKenzie, Special Branch, The Pallisers, How Green Was My Valley, The Sweeney, Tales of the Unexpected, The Professionals, Minder, Bergerac, Boon, Taggart, Miss Marple, Parnell and the Englishwoman, Casualty, Rumpole of the Bailey, Strangers and Brothers, The Bill, Dalziel and Pascoe, Holby City, Midsomer Murders, The Intruder, and The Lost Boys.

She was formerly married to the actor David Wood (1966–1970).

Selected filmography
 This, That and the Other (1969)
 She'll Follow You Anywhere (1971)
 The Swiss Conspiracy (1975)
 Who is Killing the Great Chefs of Europe? (1978)
 The Great Riviera Bank Robbery (1979)

External links

 Sheila Ruskin, Aveleyman - Actor Film & TV Vidcaps.

1946 births
Living people
English television actresses